Gordon Clark is an American activist and politician. He has served as the National Executive Director of Peace Action, and was a 2008 Green Party candidate from Maryland for the United States House of Representatives in 2008.

Activism 
Clark founded Doylestown, Pennsylvania's Peace Force in 1984. The community organization was founded to combat the nuclear war fighting policies of the Reagan Administration. From 1982–1987 Clark served as the Site and Program Manager with the Bucks County, Pennsylvania Association of Retarded Citizens, delivering services to the developmentally disabled. At the same time he served as a Member of the Bucks County (PA) Earth Day Committee. In 1991 Clark took the position of Executive Director of New Jersey Peace Action (formerly Sane/Freeze) , he worked in this job till 1995 when he took a national position with the organizations.

From 1996 through 2001 he was the National Executive Director of Peace Action , the nation's largest grassroots peace and disarmament organization, nonviolence and conflict resolution trainer. In 2002 he was a founder, and national coordinator, of the Iraq Pledge of Resistance , which by 2004 was renamed the National Campaign for Nonviolent Resistance , a national non-profit network devoted to using the nonviolent methods of Gandhi and King to oppose the war and ongoing occupation of Iraq. He was its convener until 2007.

Following his recent arrest for nonviolent protest, Clark defended himself pro se in U.S. District Court and was acquitted on all charges. Among this group of activists acquitted were Eve Tetaz and Malachy Kilbride.

Clark has also held the positions of field director of Public Citizen's Congress Watch, (2003–2006) and Project Coordinator, Chesapeake Climate Action Network, 2007.

2008 Congressional Campaign 
In 2008 Clark ran for Maryland's 8th Congressional District. Clark finished third of the four candidates on the ballot with 2.2%.

References

External links 
official 2008 Campaign Website

Maryland Greens
American anti–nuclear weapons activists
American anti-war activists
American anti–Iraq War activists
Year of birth missing (living people)
Living people